Brenda Russell is the self-titled debut studio album by American singer-songwriter Brenda Russell, released on 25 July 1979 by A&M Records on the Horizon label. The album peaked at No. 20 on the Billboard R&B albums chart.

Overview
After working for several years with her then-husband Brian Russell as session musicians and by themselves as the duo Brian & Brenda in the mid-1970s, the couple divorced and Brenda Russell embarked on a solo career by signing with A&M Records.

The album was written almost entirely by Russell and produced by Andre Fischer, who was fresh off of a stint as drummer for Rufus. The single, "So Good So Right", reached Nos. 8, 15 and 30 on the Billboard Adult Contemporary, Hot Soul Songs and Hot 100 charts, respectively.

The track, ""Think It Over", written by Russell with her then-husband Brian, was previously recorded by Charlie's Angels star Cheryl Ladd, who ironically would go on to marry Brian following the latter's divorce from Brenda.

Sampling and Covers
Luther Vandross did a cover of "If Only For One Night" on his 1985 album The Night I Fell In Love, and then in 2006, singer Janet Jackson sampled "If Only For One Night" in her song "Do It 2 Me" off the album 20 Y.O.. In 1998, American rapper Big Pun sampled "A Little Bit of Love" on his hit single "Still Not a Player". In 2003, Mexican singer Thalía sampled the song in "I Want You", and in 2013 Ariana Grande and Mac Miller sampled the same song for their Top 10 hit single, "The Way". In 2001, singer Mary J. Blige sampled "God Bless You" in her song "Flying Away". 

In 2000, the album was re-released on CD with new cover artwork and included Russell's most well known hit "Piano in the Dark" from 1988 as a bonus track.

Track listing
 "So Good, So Right" - 3:20
 "In the Thick of It" - 3:56
 "If Only for One Night" - 4:13
 "Way Back When" -  4:23
 "A Little Bit of Love" - 4:41
 "You're Free" – 3:30
 "Think It Over" - 5:17
 "God Bless You" - 4:48

All tracks composed by Brenda Russell, except:
"You're Free" (lyrics: Brenda Russell, music: Andre Fischer, Brenda Russell)
"Think It Over" (lyrics: Brenda Russell, music: Brian Russell, Brenda Russell).

Personnel 
 Brenda Russell – lead vocals, backing vocals (1-7), acoustic piano (1, 2, 3, 5), Wurlitzer electric piano (4, 7), Fender Rhodes (5), horn arrangement (5), rhythm arrangements, vocal arrangements
 Ron Stockert – Fender Rhodes (1, 3, 4, 7, 8), acoustic piano (4, 8), clavinet (5)
 Ian Underwood – synthesizers (2, 4)
 Clare Fischer – string arrangements (3, 8), organ (4, 7), concertmaster (6), electric guitar (7)
 David Wolfert – electric guitar (1, 7), horn arrangements (1), string arrangements (1, 7)
 Fred Tackett – electric guitar (1, 6), acoustic guitar (2)
 George Sopuch – electric guitar (1, 2, 6), guitar solo (6)
 Ed Brown – bass
 Andre Fischer – drums, rhythm arrangements
 Victor Feldman – percussion (2, 4), vibraphone (5)
 Henry Gibson – percussion (2)
 Hector Andrade – timbales (5)
 Tom Saviano – soprano saxophone (1)
 Doug Richardson – tenor saxophone (2, 8)
 Larry Williams – baritone saxophone (5), alto flute (5, 6)
 Bill Reichenbach Jr. - baritone (5), bass trombone (5), horn arrangements (5)
 Judd Miller – trumpet (1)
 Steve Madaio – trumpet (1), flugelhorn (1)
 Chuck Findley – flugelhorn (5, 6), piccolo trumpet (5)
 Jerry Hey – trumpet (5)
 Gary Herbig – English horn (6)
 David McKelvy – harmonica (7)
 Jerry Peters – string arrangements (4, 6), horn arrangements (6)
 Harry Bluestone – concertmaster (1, 7)
 Gerald Vinci – concertmaster (3, 8)
 Assa Drori – concertmaster (4)
 Doublerock Baptist Junior Choir – backing vocals (5)
 Michele Aller – backing vocals (5, 7, 8)
 Susaye Greene – backing vocals (5, 7, 8)
 Elaine Hill – backing vocals (5, 7, 8)
 Joe Esposito – backing vocals (7)
 Eddie Hokenson – backing vocals (7)
 Arnold McCuller –  backing vocals (7)
 Petsye Powell – backing vocals (7)
 Bruce Sudano – backing vocals (7)
 Kathy Collier – backing vocals (8)
 Venette Gloud – backing vocals (8)
 Carmen Twillie – backing vocals (8)

Production 
 Producer – Andre Fischer
 Associate Producer – Brenda Dash
 Recorded by John Rhys
 Mixed by Al Schmitt
 Mix Assistants – Don Henderson, Murray McFadden, Phil Moores and Terry More.
 Mastered by Mike Reese at The Mastering Lab (Los Angeles, CA).
 Art Direction – Roland Young
 Design – Amy Nagasawa
 Photography – Claude Mougin

Charts
Album

Singles

References 

Brenda Russell albums
1979 debut albums
Horizon Records albums